Frederick Pitt Alderman (June 24, 1905 – September 15, 1998) was an American sprint runner who won a gold medal in 4 × 400 m relay at the 1928 Summer Olympics.

At the 1928 Olympic trials Alderman set his personal best in the 400 m at 48.0 seconds, but did much worse at the Games, at estimated 49.4 s. He was a member of Sigma Alpha Epsilon while at Michigan State College.  In 1992, he was inducted into the initial class of the MSU Athletics Hall of Fame.

References

American male sprinters
1905 births
1998 deaths
Athletes (track and field) at the 1928 Summer Olympics
Olympic gold medalists for the United States in track and field
Medalists at the 1928 Summer Olympics
Michigan State Spartans men's track and field athletes
People from East Lansing, Michigan